Kronos Racing is a Belgian auto racing and rally team.

History
Kronos Racing was set up in 1994, and ran circuit racing and rallying programmes on behalf of Peugeot Belgium/Luxembourg. The team's Peugeot 306 GTIs won the Spa 24 Hours in 1999 and 2000, the last two years that the event was run as a touring car race. In 2003 Bruno Thiry won the European Rally Championship in a Peugeot 206 WRC run by the team. In 2004, Citroën Sport chose Kronos to run their programme in the Junior World Rally Championship, extending their partnership with the PSA Group. Dani Sordo won the JWRC in 2005 while driving for the team, while Manfred Stohl scored overall two podium finishes driving a Kronos-run Citroën Xsara WRC.

In 2006 Citroën took a year out of the WRC to develop the C4 WRC, and therefore used Kronos to enter Xsara WRCs under the Kronos Total Citroën World Rally Team banner. Sébastien Loeb took his third Drivers' title for Citroën thanks to Kronos, beating the Ford World Rally Team and driver Marcus Grönholm. Kronos also ran Xavier Pons and Sordo, while Colin McRae drove on one event as a stand-in for the injured Loeb.

In 2007 Kronos continued to run Xsaras in the WRC, mainly for Stohl. In addition, Kronos began competing in the Intercontinental Rally Challenge with Peugeot, winning the title in 2008 with Nicolas Vouilloz. In 2009, Kris Meeke won the title for Peugeot UK, his car run by Kronos.

WRC Results

IRC results

References

External links

Belgian auto racing teams
World Rally Championship teams
Intercontinental Rally Challenge teams
European Rally Championship teams
24 Hours of Le Mans teams
Auto racing teams established in 1994